Lisandro Ezequiel López (born 1 September 1989) is an Argentine professional footballer who plays for Liga MX club Tijuana as a defender.

Club career
López made his official debut with Chacarita Juniors on 22 August 2009 in a loss against CA Tigre, amounting 24 games in 2009–10 Argentine Primera División.

In July 2010, López joined Arsenal de Sarandí on a free transfer, where he established himself as a centre back, helping the team win the 2012 Clausura. His performances drew attention from European clubs such as Arsenal, A.C. Milan, Málaga CF, and Benfica, in the latter side as a potential replacement for his fellow countryman Ezequiel Garay.

On 10 July 2013, López signed with Portuguese club Benfica on a five-year deal and with a €35 million buy-out clause, being initially loaned for one year to La Liga side Getafe CF. In 2014–15, he was guaranteed a place in Benfica and made his debut on 5 October 2014 in a 4–0 home win over Arouca in Primeira Liga.

On 15 January 2018, Lopez moved to Italian side Inter Milan on a six-month loan with the option to buy. Later, on 5 August that year, he was loaned out to another Serie A club, Genoa, until 30 June 2019. The loan, however, was terminated in January 2019.

On 30 January 2019, López joined Boca Juniors on a loan deal until 31 December. On 1 November, Benfica announced that he had been transferred permanently to the Argentinian side for €2.70m.

Career statistics

Club

International

Honours
Arsenal de Sarandí
Primera División: 2012 Clausura
Supercopa Argentina: 2012
Benfica
Primeira Liga: 2014–15, 2015–16, 2016–17
Taça de Portugal: 2016–17
Taça da Liga: 2014–15, 2015–16
Supertaça Cândido de Oliveira: 2016, 2017
Boca Juniors
Primera División: 2019–20
Copa Argentina: 2019–20
Copa de la Liga Profesional: 2020
Supercopa Argentina: 2018

Individual
Liga MX All-Star: 2022

References

External links
 

1989 births
Living people
Argentine footballers
Argentine expatriate footballers
Argentina international footballers
Association football defenders
Argentine Primera División players
Chacarita Juniors footballers
Arsenal de Sarandí footballers
Primeira Liga players
S.L. Benfica footballers
La Liga players
Getafe CF footballers
Serie A players
Inter Milan players
Genoa C.F.C. players
Boca Juniors footballers
Expatriate footballers in Spain
Expatriate footballers in Portugal
Expatriate footballers in Italy
Argentine expatriate sportspeople in Spain
Argentine expatriate sportspeople in Portugal
Argentine expatriate sportspeople in Italy
Sportspeople from Santa Fe Province